Maksym Yurіyovich Burbak (born 13 January 1976) is a Ukrainian politician and former Minister of Infrastructure of Ukraine. He was an MP of Ukraine from 2012 until 2019. First as member of the party Batkivshchyna, followed as member of People's Front. In July 2015 Burbak was elected parliamentary leader of the People's Front parliamentary faction.

Burbak is President of the NGO "Interregional Agricultural Society" (Chernivtsi).

Education 
In 1998 he graduated from the Faculty of Law Chernivtsi National University with speciality  "Jurisprudence".

Career 
 1998–2005 – commercial activities.
 2006–2008 – Deputy Director of "Fintrast", Chernivtsi.
 From July 2008 – Acting Director of "Bucovina Auto Alliance", Chernivtsi.
 2010–2012 – Member of the Chernivtsi Regional Council, the head of the "Front for Change".

Former member of the party "Front for Change", led the Chernivtsi regional organization.

In the 2012 parliamentary election Burbak was elected into parliament for the party Batkivshchyna, № 43 on the list. Chairman of the Subcommittee on the development strategy of the customs policy of free trade and economic integration of the Parliamentary Committee on Taxation and Customs Policy.

On 27 February 2014 Burbak was appointed Minister of Infrastructure of Ukraine in the first Yatsenyuk Government of Prime Minister Arseniy Yatsenyuk; he did not return in the second Yatsenyuk Government.

In the 2014 parliamentary election Burbak was elected into parliament again as People's Front candidate in single-member districts number 45 situated in Khotyn with 24.22% of the votes. On 3 July 2015 Burbak was elected parliamentary leader of the People's Front parliamentary faction.

In the 2019 Ukrainian parliamentary election Burbak lost reelection as an independent  candidate in single-seat constituency 204 (Chernivtsi Oblast).

Family 
Married. He has two children. Burbak's older brother Oleksiy Burbak was a classmate of Arseniy Yatsenyuk.

References

External links 
 Biography

1976 births
Politicians from Chernivtsi
Living people
All-Ukrainian Union "Fatherland" politicians
Front for Change (Ukraine) politicians
Chernivtsi University alumni
Seventh convocation members of the Verkhovna Rada
Infrastructure ministers of Ukraine
Eighth convocation members of the Verkhovna Rada
People's Front (Ukraine) politicians